Gadaka is a town in Yobe State, Nigeria located at latitude 11°18′N and longitude 11°22′E, with a population of about 60,000 people. It is located in the southern part of the state, near the boundary with Gombe and Bauchi states. It used to be the capital of the defunct Gadaka Local Government Area, created by Shehu Shagari's administration. It is the largest town in the Fika Local Government Area. Located at about 12 km off the Potiskum-Gombe main road, Gadaka town is about 55 km from the commercial city of Potiskum and 125 km from Gombe, the Gombe State capital.

Geography
The county elevation is about 1,483 feet. The hottest months are March and April with temperature ranges of 38–40° Celsius. In the rainy season, May–September, temperatures fall to 23–28° Celsius, with rainfall of 700 to 1200mm.[2] The westward monsoonal wind marks the end of the rainy season. Vegetation cover is mostly grass and is green only during the rainy season, which dries at the onset of the harmattan.

Economy
Gadaka is predominantly an agricultural town. Soils are mostly sandy-loamy and humus, rich in manure and elements that support plant growth. Cultivation intensity stands at 45% cultivated, whereas the remaining 55% is covered by natural vegetation. Farm produce, such as groundnuts, beans, guinea corn, maize, sorghum, and millet, is produced in commercial quantities. The Ngeji river in the western part of the town has rich fishing in places and also serves as the major source of water for irrigation. Crops such as rice, tomatoes, onion, pepper, eggplants, Cocoayam and sugarcane are cultivated year-round in areas along the river bank. Mineral resources found in the area of Gadaka include limestone, gypsum, kaolin, phosphate, and quartz.

Transportation is mainly by road; global communication networking from Gadaka Town is via mobile telephone. Examples of these codes are +234 802.., +234808.., +234805..., and +234807....+234803..., +234806. Internet access is possible either through personal links with major internet service providers using modems or through commercial browsing centres located in the town squares.

Government
Gadaka town is the location of the court of Mai Gudi, the first-class Emir of Gudi and chairman of the famous Gudi emirate council, His Royal Highness Alhaji Isa Bunuwo khahaji Gudi I. Top members of the Emirate council include the Waziri of Gudi, Alhaji Masaya, the Yerima of Gudi Alhaji Samaila Ahmed Gadaka, the Kaigaman Gudi Dr Ibrahim Garba Kurmi, Sarkin Fada Gudi Alhaji Ibrahim Babi, the Magaji of Gudi Alhaji Muhammadu Baba, the Madaki of Gudi Alhaji Adamu Usman Bazam, the Galadima of Gudi AVM Bashir Yakasai, Dan Masanin of Gudi Mal. Abdullahi Gadaka. The administrative hierarchy in Gadaka town starts from the Bulama (ward head) to Lamba (town or village head) and then to the Ajiya (district head. All these are custodians of the people's culture and beliefs, and as such answerable to his Highness, the Mai Gudi.

Language and culture
Ngamo is the native language of Gadaka, classified as one of the Chadic languages of the Afro-Asiatic language family. Alternative names for Ngamo include Gamawa, Gamo, and Ngamawa. Other languages in the area are Bolewa, Karai-Karai, Ngizim, Kanuri, Hausa, and Fulani.

The native Ngamo language has two major dialects, viz, Gudi Ngamo and Yaya Ngamo. These dialects are spoken by the various clans both within and outside Gadaka. The dialects have suffered incessant incrustation by neighbouring languages especially the Bole, Karai-Karai, and Hausa, and sometimes English, which is used by a majority of the youths during communication. All the major Ngamo clans are found now in Gadaka town, which include the Gudi clan (largest), the kushi clan (rulers of the central Gadaka area), the  Shula (mainly warriors and hunters), the Ziu clan, the Mele clan, the Shembire clan (The Barbers), the Bopali, etc.

The people of Gadaka have a very rich cultural heritage. The most important annual cultural occasion is the Eid al-Kabir festival which has now replaced the famous Kamti festival. But still activities such as the wasan makara (for blacksmiths), wasan Wanzamai (for barbers), wasan Farauta (for hunters) and the traditional wrestling competition of the old Kamti festival are still adopted in today's Eid festivals.  Gadaka is surrounded by smaller villages such as Fika, (9 km distant), Garin Malam Yako (6 km), Dadin Kowa (8 km), Babaji - (2 km), Dadin Kowa Semo - (13 km), Babanana - (11 km), Garin Aba - (12 km), Jajiyaya - (9 km), Ga dana - (6 km), Balde - (12 km), Japde - (11 km), Dawarko - (6 km),  Usaku - (8 km), Bozoganga - (5 km), Shembire - (7 km), Garin Jangam - (4 km), Daniski - (10 km), Pokkitok - (11 km), Tamana - (11 km), Garin Meri - (4 km), Shembire - (2 km), Yawale - (3 km), Garin Aba - (11 km), Kukawa - (8 km), Lamba Disa - (3 km), Bogargar - (5 km),  Maiduwa - (10 km), Sayo - (3 km), Goge -(5 km), Garin Gamji-(4 km) Jajiyaya(4 km), Kuli, Zadawa, (7 km). Others are Gashinge,Lampo,G.Dauya,G. Waziri Kadi, Gamari, Daniski, Kurmi, Fusami, Siminti, Gadana, Jigawa, Godowoli etc.

Demographics and society
The available population statistics on Gadaka indicate a population density of 165 people per square mile. Malnutrition indices suggest 3.0% of children below 5 years old are underweight. Infant mortality stands at 101 per 1000 births. Life expectancy at birth is 52.76 years for males and 54.41 years for females (2011 estimates). Night light intensity is almost 0%.

The town is blessed with sons and daughters that have distinguished themselves in their field of endeavour. Notable are Alhaji Barde Gadaka, Alhaji Ibrahim Nikau, the late Alhaji Abba Disa Gadaka, Alhaji Isa Ibrahim Babi, Hajiya Hauwa Abubakar Ajeje, Alhaji musa Lagide Lire, Barrister Saleh Dibbo Gadaka, the late Lawan Bundi, the late Alhaji Isah Gadaka, the late Alhaji Shehu Gadaka, the late Wakili Muhammadu Konjolo, Mr Joshua Bulus, Alhaji Audu Bukar, Alhaji Haruna Gimba, Mohammed Abdullahi Gadaka, Barr. Mohammed Baba Gadaka and Kabiru Alhaji Haruna, to mention but a few.

Gadaka people are very social and hospitable, with an utmost sense of humility and understanding. They welcome and accommodate students, traders, foreign investors, mechanized farmers and tourists.

References

Jibir Audu Janga Dole, Umaru Mamu Goge and Isa Adamu Gashinge, 2009, Ngamo-English-Hausa Dictionary, Yobe Languages Research Project.
M.B. Saleh (2011): "The Chronicle of Gadaka town".
Oral History of Gadaka town by Alhaji Muhammadu Sarkin Noma and Babansiri Audu mai Kanwa, all of Tsohon kasuwa, Gadaka Yobe State, Nigeria.
 Oral History of Gadaka by Alhaji Haruna Gimba

External links
 About Gadaka town. (Accessed on 3 August 2011)
Local Governments of Yobe state (Accessed on 2nd Aug, 2011)
Populated places in Yobe State,  (Accessed on 3rd Aug, 2011)
Statistics on Gadaka,   (Accessed on 3rd Aug, 2011)
Nigerian statistics. (Accessed on 3rd Aug, 2011)
Map of Gadaka and its environs (Accessed on 1st Aug, 2011)

Populated places in Yobe State